An Feng Steel is a steel maker of Taiwan. Its manufacturing factory is located in Kaohsiung. It was the second largest steel company in Taiwan, but broke out a financial crisis in 1998. According to the records  announced by banks of Taiwan, An Feng Steel is already left behind much more than 1.17 billion New Taiwan Dollars in bad debt.

See also
 List of companies of Taiwan

References

Steel companies of Taiwan
Manufacturing companies based in Kaohsiung
Taiwanese companies established in 1986